The game of French Tarot is a trick-taking strategy tarot card game played by three to five players using a traditional 78-card tarot deck. The game is the second most popular card game in France and is also played in French-speaking Canada.

Background 

France was one of the first two countries outside of Italy to start playing tarot, the other being Switzerland. While various types of tarot games were played in France since the 16th century, the dominant form now popular is the 19th-century rule set from Bourgogne-Franche-Comté. Historically, tarot games in France were played with the Italian-suited Tarot of Marseilles which had Renaissance allegorical images on the atouts while lacking reversible face cards and trumps and corner indices. For ease of play, the late 19th century French-suited "Tarot Nouveau" or "Bourgeois Tarot" supplanted the Marseilles Tarot with depictions of typical fin de siècle genre scenes of French life and leisure.

In English, the game is referred to as French Tarot or sometimes as French tarot, however, the latter usually refers to tarot cards of French origin or to cartomantic tarot and not to the game. The name French Tarot is used in English to differentiate the card game from other uses of the tarot deck that are more familiar in the Americas and English-speaking countries, particularly the decks used for cartomancy and other divinatory purposes, and also to distinguish it from other card games played with a tarot deck. The unique feature that distinguishes French Tarot from other forms of tarot games is the over-trumping rule. In France it is just known as jeu de Tarot.

History 
Cards appeared in Europe towards the end of the 14th century and may have been introduced first through Italy or  Catalonia. Tarot cards are first mentioned in the mid-15th century in Italy. Initially called trionfi, meaning "triumph", whence the name "trump" in English, the Italians later called them tarocchi as the idea of trumps spread to other card games. Both the Italian word tarocchi and the French word tarot occur from the early 16th century onwards, although it is unclear whether one was derived from the other.

Tarot was introduced into France in the early 16th century as a result of the First and Second Italian Wars (1494–1522) and is widely recorded in French literature of that century, the earliest reference being that by Rabelais in Gargantua in 1534. By 1622 it had become more popular in France than chess and the earliest account appeared around 1637 in Nevers. This describes a three-player, 78-card game played with an Italian-suited pack with the Fool acting as an Excuse and the suits ranking in their 'original' order i.e. with numeral cards in the suits of Cups and Coins ranking from Ace (high) to Ten (low). This ranking is retained in all Tarot games today except in France and Sicily. In France, Tarot remained in vogue until 1650, but then its popularity steadily waned to the point where, in 18th century France, it was barely played outside the Provence region.

The game experienced a revival in the course of the late 18th and 19th centuries. The original Italian-suited cards typified by the Tarot de Marseille came to be viewed as Italian and were replaced by French designs, notably the Tarot Nouveau.

There is some evidence that Napoleon's troops introduced Tarot, in the form of Droggn – a Tarot game with similarities to old French Tarot – into Austrian Tyrol. It is also recorded that French soldiers were issued with Tarot packs during the Franco-Prussian War (1870), First World War (1914–18) and Algerian War (1954–62), leading in each case to the spread of le jeu de Tarot throughout France according to Dummett and Berloquin. In 1973, the French Tarot Federation (Fédération Française de Tarot) was formed and, by the late 20th century, Tarot had become the second-most popular card game in France, only trailing Belote. Part of the reason why French Tarot persisted is the fact that the rules have been very consistent wherever the game is played. However, it is important to note that details of play outside of officially sanctioned tournaments may vary from circle to circle so that the known rules and terminologies are more typical than definitive.

In 18th century France, Tarot cards first became associated with fortune telling, a practice that spread to much of the Western world. However, the cards preferred for divination are the older Italian-suited packs or bespoke modern designs, which have occultic symbology, rather than the packs with scenes of everyday life like the French Tarot Nouveau and Austro-Hungarian Industrie und Glück packs.

Deck 

The game of tarot is played using a 78-card tarot deck. This deck is composed of:

 21 numbered trump cards (atouts),  and 1 unnumbered trump card: the "Excuse" or "Fool" (L'excuse or Fou)
 3 of which (oudlers) are trumps with particular importance: the 1 of trumps, the 21 of trumps and the "Excuse" (or Fool) as these determine the contract the taker commits to in that particular game.  
 4 suits of 14 cards each: 
 numbered "pip cards" (aka 'fillers') from 1 to 10 have no true value, except when taking its "fold" or add .5 point at counting (the "Ace" has always the lowest value and so it is marked with number 1 instead of the "A" common in 52-card decks),

Rank of cards 
These cards, when captured by the high bidder, lower the point threshold needed to fulfill the contract. In colloquial French, oudlers are often referred to as bouts (ends).

The ranking of the hearts, clubs, diamonds and spades from the top is: King, Queen, Knight, Jack, 10, 9, 8, 7, 6, 5, 4, 3, 2, 1 (Ace).

As an aside, the trumps and Fool can be removed to yield a 56-card deck very similar to a 52-card French deck but with the additional Cavalier (knight, lit. horseman) court card in each suit. This deck configuration, plus the Fool, was copied using culture-neutral card designs and values to create the deck for the Rook game.

Excuse 

The only card with a special effect is the "Fool", L'Excuse. The  may be played on any trick; it "excuses" the player from following suit. However, it normally doesn't win the trick. The card also normally remains the property of the person who played it, not the winner of that trick; to compensate for this in the scoring count, the owner of the Excuse should instead give the winner of the trick a half-point card (a trump other than an oudler, or a suited number card; see Scoring) from his or her score pile.

Two common exceptions to the above behaviors are seen when the Excuse is played on the last trick, and what happens depends on whether the side playing the Fool has taken all the previous tricks (see /Slam below). If the side has taken all previous tricks, the card takes the last trick; if not, it changes hands to the other side, even if the trick is won by a partner or fellow defender of the person playing it.

Rules 

For 3 or 4 players (5 with a simple variation). The 4-player variant is usually considered the most challenging and is the one played in competitions. The following rules are for 4 players.

Dealing 
Players draw for the first deal; the person with the lowest-value card deals first, with suits ordered spades > hearts > diamonds > clubs as a tiebreaker. All trumps rank higher than any suited card; anyone who draws the Fool must redraw. From this point, the deal will pass to the right (counterclockwise) for each subsequent deal.

The player at the left of the dealer cuts the deck. The dealer then deals out the entire deck, counter-clockwise, starting with the player on their right. Each player is dealt their cards in "packets" of three consecutive cards at a time (they will each receive 6 such packets for a total of 18 cards). "dog", alt. "kitty", "talon" or "nest") of 6 cards is dealt one card at a time into the center of the table, while dealing to the other players. A card may be dealt to the dog at any time, but the dealer may not:

 deal the dog two consecutive cards,
 deal the dog a card from the middle of a player's "packet", or
 deal the first or last card of the deck to the dog.

A common valid dealing order is player A → player B → dog → player C → dealer, but this is just one possible permutation and the dealer is free to invent his own while following the above rules.

A  (misdeal) occurs when the dealer makes mistakes in the dealing; if this happens, the hand is redealt, either by the same dealer or the next in rotation. Players inspect, sort and evaluate their hands, and then move on to the bidding round.

Annulment 
Before the bidding phase, if one player has a "Petit sec" (only one trump in hand, and it is the Petit, and does not have the Fool), then the player has to announce it and the hand is redealt. If it is discovered later in the game that a player had a "Petit sec", then it is also annulled and redealt by the following dealer.

Bidding 
The players look at the cards they have been dealt, and an auction begins, starting from the player to the right of the dealer, as all action proceeds counter-clockwise. By bidding, a player states their confidence that they will be able to meet a set contract (see below) and sets the terms by which they will try to do so. If a player does not wish to bid, they may "pass" but may not bid after having passed previously. One may only bid higher than the previous bidders. The preneur ("taker", sometimes called "declarer" as in Bridge) is the one who wins this auction; they must try to meet the contract while all other players form the "defense" and attempt to prevent the taker from doing so.

The level of player's bid is based on the strength of their hand, usually estimated by counting the points within it. See evaluating one's hand below for a method to determine the points within one's hand.

The bids are, in increasing importance:
The discarded cards form the beginning of the taker's score pile (the tricks pile). The name of this stack evolves from "le chien" to "l'écart" ("the aside").
 ("push"): same actions and scoring as a prise, but outranks the prise and generally indicates a stronger hand value. This bid is not in the official rules, and is a holdover from an older bidding system (see below).
 ("guard"): the same actions as prise, but the taker wins or loses double the usual stake.
 ("guard without" the dog): the dog goes directly into the taker's score pile, and no-one gets to see it until the end of the hand. The score is counted normally against the target number, but it is worth double the garde score (4x the base hand score) to whomever wins the hand.
 ("guard against" the dog): the dog goes directly into the opposing score pile, without being shown until the end of the hand. The score is counted normally against the target number, but it is worth triple the garde score (6x the base hand score) to whomever wins the hand.

If no one bids, the hand is void and the deal passes to the right of the current dealer.

On a prise, pousse or garde, the taker may not set aside a king or a trump, except that if the player cannot discard anything else, they may discard a non-oudler trump. In this case, the taker has to display which trumps they set aside. An oudler may never be set aside.

In earlier rules, still played outside of competitions, in place of the prise and simple garde, there were two bids, in increasing importance: the petite (small) and the pousse (push). The prise is still sometimes known as petite. There are also some players who play without the prise contract, with garde as the minimum allowable bid.

Main phase 

The player to the right of the dealer leads the first trick, and the play proceeds counter-clockwise, with every player playing a card from his hand to the trick. Tricks are evaluated in a similar fashion as other trick-taking games with a trump suit; the highest trump, if played, takes the trick, and if trump is not played, the highest-value card of the led suit takes the trick. Every subsequent trick is led by the player who took the last trick. The leader of a trick can play any card they like.

Once the leader of a trick has played a card, everyone else must follow suit (play a card of that same suit, if they have one). If the first card played in a trick is the Fool, the required suit to follow is determined by the following card. If a player cannot follow suit, he must play a trump card if able, and additionally, the player is compelled to play a higher trump than any existing trump in the trick if he is able (The "Petit" or 1 is valued lowest, and the "Monde" or 21 is valued highest). If a player must trump but cannot overtrump, they can play any trump. If a player cannot follow suit or trump, he may play any card to the trick, however any card they play in such a situation cannot win the trick.

If the trick is led with a trump, all other players must play a trump, and each trump must exceed the rank of all trump previously played in the trick if possible. If this is not possible, a lower-ranked trump, or any card if the player has no trumps, can be played.

The Fool (L'Excuse) may be played to any trick, instead of following suit or trumping.  The Fool never wins the trick, unless it is played to the last trick and the side playing it has taken every previous trick. However, it never changes sides, unless played to the last trick and the side playing it has not won every trick. After playing the Fool to a trick, the player who played it simply takes the Fool back, places it into their scoring pile and gives the side who took the trick an "ordinary" card (worth a half-point; see scoring below) from their scoring pile.

The official FFT tournament rules do not cover the public or private nature of the contents of scoring piles during play. Generally in trick-taking games, the contents of players' scoring piles are not public information during play of the hand, except in cases where a revoke is suspected (a player not following suit, trumping or overtrumping when it was possible for them to do so). A player is neither required to divulge the contents of his score pile, nor is he permitted to look through it except as necessary to find a half-point card to replace the Fool.

Scoring 
When the last trick has been played, the round ends. The taker counts the number of oudlers and the point value of all cards in his scoring pile. Alternatively, if the taker has taken the majority of tricks, the defenders can pool their scoring piles and count their oudlers and points; the taker has all remaining points.

Value of the cards 

Cards for scoring purposes are divided into two groups: "counters" (face cards and oudlers) and "ordinary" cards or cartes basses (any suited pip card, and any trump except the 1 and 21). Cards are paired, with each counter matched to an ordinary card, and remaining ordinary cards are also paired. The values of pairs are then counted and summed:
1 King or oudler + 1 ordinary card: 5 points
1 Queen + 1 ordinary card: 4 points
1 Knight + 1 ordinary card: 3 points
1 Jack + 1 ordinary card: 2 points
2 ordinary cards: 1 point

Each card thus has an individual value; the pairing simply makes it easier to count points. If a card cannot be paired, because there are an odd number in the scoring pile (common with three or five players) or more counters than ordinary cards:
Kings and oudlers are worth  points each;
Queens are worth ;
Knights are worth ;
Jacks are worth ;
All other cards are worth  point.

Winning 
The number of points the taker needs depends on how many of the oudlers (Excuse, Petit, 21 of trumps) are among his won tricks.

With 3 oudlers the taker needs at least 36 card points to win;
With 2 oudlers the taker needs at least 41 card points to win;
With 1 oudler the taker needs at least 51 card points to win;
With none the taker needs at least 56 card points to win.

There are 91 points to be taken in a round, so if the taker has:
3 oudlers, the defenders need at least  card points to win;
2 oudlers, the defenders need at least  card points to win;
1 oudler, the defenders need at least  card points to win;
no oudler, the defenders need at least  card points to win.

Updating the scorecard 
Scoring in Tarot is "zero-sum"; when one player gains points, one or more other players lose an equal number. 
To calculate the basic "hand score" that is to be added or deducted, the scorer starts with a basic score of 25 points, then adds the absolute (non-negative) difference between the points earned by the taker and the threshold, and, if any, the  bonus. Thus, calculation of the hand score is expressed by the formula

s = (25 + E + P) × M + H + S

where:
E = Extra Points (points above the target score, or below if the target score is not hit)
P =  bonus (see below)
M = Multiplier (1, 2, 4, or 6 depending on the taker's bid level)
H = Handful bonus (see below)
S = Slam bonus (see below)

If the taker beats the target score, this hand score is deducted from the score of each defender. If the taker misses the target score, this score is added to the score of each defender. The opposite of the sum of the defenders' gain or loss is then added to or deducted from the taker's score to balance the scores; with four players, the taker will gain or lose three times the hand score depending on whether the taker made or missed the contract. The sum of all scores for each hand, and thus the sum of the running totals after each hand, should be zero.

For example, a Garde Sans bid with a simple handful won by player A by a margin of 12 points gives the following hand score:  = 168 points. This score is deducted from the scores of all defenders and the sum of this loss is added to the taker's score, hence the scorecard:
A +504
B −168
C −168
D −168

Some players prefer to round the scores to the nearest 10 points after each game, however care must be taken as the scores should still sum to zero. Rounding each of the above scores independently yields 500 − 170 − 170 − 170 = −10. If rounding is to be done, the defenders' scores should be rounded and the taker's score adjusted accordingly. Doing so in the above example would make the taker's score 510, thus it balances out.

This is not the only scoring method; the alternative is seen below.

Soft shuffling

After each round, the cards are gathered, cut by the previous dealer, and dealt by the person to the right of the previous dealer. The cards are not commonly shuffled other than the "soft shuffling" that occurs as a natural result of playing the cards. By not shuffling, groups of desirable cards are kept together such that one person generally has a favorable enough hand to open the bidding. With shuffling between deals it is unlikely for any one player to be dealt a hand he is willing to bid on; this leads to multiple redeals before a hand is actually played.

Bonuses

If a player's hand contains no trumps or no court cards (roi, dame, cavalier, valet), the player can declare Misère, which gives the declarer 30 points and subtracts 10 from the other players scores. This bonus is a common house rule and is not considered "official" by the Fédération Française de Tarot for tournament purposes.

If a player has 10 or more trumps in their hand, they can declare a single (10+), double (13+), or triple (15+) "handful" (poignée), right before playing their first card. A single handful adds 20 to the scoring. Doubles and triples add 40 and 60, respectively. The bonus is always added to the hand score, so if a player thinks that his or her side may not win, they might not want to declare a handful, so as not to give the other side points. The declaring player must show at least the number of trump cards for the level of the bonus declared. The Fool counts as a trump for the purposes of declaring handfuls, but if shown it gives information to other players as it usually means that the declaring player has no additional trumps. This bonus is not multiplied according to the contract.

When the last trick contains the Petit (1 of trump), 10 points is added to or deducted from the hand score before multiplying. Whether it is added or subtracted depends on which would most benefit the side taking the trick with the Petit au bout (One at the End). Usually, when one side (taker or defenders) makes Petit au bout but the other side was successful in either making or breaking contract, the bonus is subtracted; when one side is successful in the contract and also makes Petit au bout, the bonus is added. If the side attempting the Petit au bout wins all the tricks, the player gets the petit au bout bonus if the Petit was played at the second to last trick (and won the trick) and the Fool was played at the last trick. This bonus is multiplied according to the contract; if the contract is Guard Without, the gain or loss for a single hand score is adjusted by 40 points one way or the other.

To Slam (in French, chelem) is to take every trick in the round. "Announced" Slam (made while bidding in the auction) gains 400 points if made. It grants the taker the right (and obligation) to start the first trick. Otherwise, a non-announced Slam made by either the taker or the defenders gains 200 points. Failure to fulfill a pre-declared Slam costs the announcer 200 points. This bonus is not multiplied according to the contract.

Petit Slam 
"Petit Slam" is a bid to take every trick but three. It is, like the misère, unofficial. An unannounced Petit Slam is worth 150 points, while an announced slam can gain the taker 300 points or lose them 150 if they make or miss.

Variants

Petit imprenable 
In Petit imprenable ("untouchable Petit"), a player who has no trump except the Petit can still play, but the Petit is played like the Fool; if it does not take the trick, it is given back to its owner in exchange for a half-point card.

In Petit sec ("dry Petit"), a player who has the Petit but no other trump nor the Fool must announce this; the hand is voided and this round will be redealt by the next dealer. Common house rules also allow a player to declare a maldonne if their hand has no trumps, or fewer than a given number of combined trumps and face cards.

Three-player variant 
The dog consists of six cards, each hand of 24 cards, dealt in packets of three. 13 trumps are needed for a single handful, 15 for a double handful, 18 for a triple.

Five-player variant 
The dog consists of three cards, each hand of 15 cards, dealt in packets of three. 8 trumps are needed for a single handful, 10 for a double, 13 for a triple. Before calling the dog and scoring his three cards, the taker calls the King of any suit. Whoever has that King becomes the taker's partner, and plays with him against the other players. If the taker has all four kings, he calls a queen. If the taker has all four kings and all four queens, he calls a knight. The taker must play alone if he has all kings, queens and knights.

In the Austrian tarot game of Königrufen, this king-calling mechanism is used so that four-player play two against two.

The King is called before anything is done with the dog; therefore, the taker may call a King that is in the dog. In this case, the taker plays alone; he has technically called himself as partner if the dog's cards are to be integrated into the hand, and in any case no other player has that King in hand.

In scoring, the taker's partner gets one "hand score" added to or taken from his score if the taker makes or misses his contract. So, if taker beats the target score, each defender loses the hand score, the partner gains the hand score, and the taker gets twice the hand score. If he misses, the gains and losses are reversed.

Higher Garde Contre 
A popular variant is setting the multiplier for the Garde Contre to 8 instead of 6.

Parole bid 
In some social games, and in order to avoid abandoned deals and the redistribution of cards, it is possible to have a bid of Parole: the player does not commit to a contract but reserves judgment until a second round of bidding. Depending on the variants, this allows you to freely choose a bid from Prise to Garde Contre, or just a Prise. This variant is not accepted in tournaments.

Pousse contract 
In some regions, there is a Pousse between the Petit and the Garde. Instead of having multipliers, the contracts are then worth fixed amounts of 10, 20, 40, 80 or 160 points. In this case, the single Prise is called the Petite (the player says in this case "Petite"). In this variant the player does not say "I" in the other bids, simply saying "garde" or "pousse" for example. When a player has made a bid and another player outbids, the first player can in turn outbid or leave i.e. it is bidding with immediate hold.

Scoring with chips

A simple way to keep score, and to gamble in Tarot, utilizes a number of poker chips or similar tokens. The bid levels correspond to 1, 2, 4, and 6/8 chips or units. Each player bids or raises by increasing the number of chips, similar to Poker but without the option of folding. Each player's wager remains in front of him, and the taker adds an extra matching stack for each defender. If the taker wins, he gets all the chips on the table. If the taker loses, the defenders divide the chips evenly.

Rules on what happens when someone runs out of chips or cannot cover the current wager vary. Most often the player who is short cannot win more than was wagered; if the taker is short and wins, he only wins an equal stack from each defender (Table stakes). If he loses, the defenders split his chips as evenly as possible. If a defender is short, the taker can only win, and must only cover, the amount the defender has remaining. The game may end when someone runs out, in which case the person with the most chips wins. Alternatively, play may continue, with the chip values of each bid level increased. The player who has run out must still play, and may or may not be able to win chips by helping to set the taker.

Strategy

Evaluating one's hand 
As a guide to bidding, a player can award points for various features of his hand, judging his bid according to the total number of points.

Each range of point totals suggests a different bid:
less than 40 points: Passe (no bid)
40 to 55 points: Prise
56 to 70 points: Garde
71 to 80 points: Garde Sans
80+ points: Garde Contre

Getting the Petit 
It is essential to try to get the Petit if one can. In a 5-player game, if the taker has the 21 of trump, he shall always play it so his partner can secure the Petit if he's got it. If the taker has many trumps, he can perform a chasse au petit (Petit hunt), trying to play his trumps so that the Petit owner has no choice but to give it away.

Observation 
Every player should know which suits have been played, and which are still to be played. It is useful to count how many trumps, and what kings, have been played.

Statistics

Distribution of suits 
The following table shows the maximum number of suits and trumps for a Defender for 4 players.

Example: Suppose the taker has 8 hearts, thus the Defenders have 6 hearts. In 5.3% of the cases, one Defender has 5 or more hearts. Notice that the sum from any column is 100%. If the taker has 9 trumps, thus the Defense has 12 trumps. There is a 1.1% probability that one Defender has 9 or more trumps.

Dog's cards 
This applies to 4 players and 6-card dog.

Example: If the taker has no queen, he has a 30.5% chance of getting a queen in the dog, 4.4% of two queens. If the taker has 8 diamonds, thus there are 14-8=6 diamonds left, he has a 51.6% chance of not getting any diamond in the dog at all. If the taker has 7 trumps, thus there are 21-7=14 trumps left, he has a 43% chance of getting 2 or more trumps.

Signals 
The Fédération Française de Tarot has developed a system of conventional leads that lets partners communicate the value and number of the cards in hand. An outline of the system follows.

At the outset (indicated by 1 card)

In a suit:
 A card from Ace to 5 signals that the player holds a major honor (King-Queen).
 A card higher than the 5 signals that the player does not hold such an honor.

In trumps:
 An odd trump signals possession of at least 7 trumps, and requests that partner play trumps.
 An even trump played at the beginning of part announces possession of fewer than 7 trumps.

With the Supply (indicated by 2 cards)

Suit played by the attacker:
 Order going down: behavior 5th in the suit invites to play trump (attention not to have the Petit in hand).
 The Excuse on starts attacker with the first or with the second turn promises the behavior

Suit played by defense:
 Two cards of the same suit played in descending order signal that the player held a doubleton in this suit. The player's partner is implicitly expected to continue playing this suit so that the player can overtrump.

When a player indicates the strength of his or her hand by playing a king or an odd trump, it imposes a line of play to which the partners are duty bound to adhere.

 Excuse at the first round of trumps: Player demands an end to trumps.

References

Footnotes

Bibliography 
 Daynes, Daniel (2000). Le Tarot, ses règles et toutes ses variantes, Bornemann, April 2000. 
 Depaulis, Thierry (1984). Le Tarot de Paris, ed. André Dimanche 1984.
 Depaulis, Thierry (2004). Brève histoire des cartes à jouer, dans Cartes à jouer et Tarots de Marseille, éditions Alors Hors du Temps. 
 
 Parlett, David (1996). Oxford Dictionary of Card Games. Oxford: OUP.

External links
Fédération Française de Tarot, official website of the French Tarot Federation.
Rules of the game at pagat.com
general information on the game of tarot
Shogix.net
American Tarot Game Association

Instructional video on French Tarot
Online platform to play Tarot

 
Four-player card games
French card games